The 1914 United States elections elected the members of the 64th United States Congress, occurring in the middle of Democratic President Woodrow Wilson's first term. Democrats retained control of both houses of Congress, the first time they were able to do so since the American Civil War (1861-1865).

Republicans won massive gains in the House, but Democrats maintained a solid majority in the chamber.

In the first Senate election since the passage of the 17th Amendment, Democrats won small gains, maintaining control of the chamber. This would also be the first of five times since the passage of the 17th amendment that the president's party gained Senate seats and lost House seats, something that would be repeated by Democrats in 1962 and 2022, and by Republicans in 1970 and 2018.

See also
1914 United States House of Representatives elections
1914 United States Senate elections
1914 United States gubernatorial elections

References

 
1914
United States midterm elections